The Musa is a river on the eastern side of the Papuan Peninsula, in Papua New Guinea.  It is one of the primary rivers on Oro Province.   Its mouth exits into Dyke Ackland Bay.

A plan to dam the river in 1975 caused local opposition.

References

Rivers of Papua New Guinea